Anne Herbert (1950-2015) was an American journalist and author. She was raised in Ohio and wrote mostly in California.

Biography
Herbert was an assistant editor of CoEvolution Quarterly, a precursor to the Whole Earth Review. She coined the phrases, "Practice random kindness and senseless acts of beauty." and (paraphrasing The Fabulous Furry Freak Brothers) "Libraries will get you through times of no money better than money will get you through times of no
libraries." Her book The Rising Sun Neighborhood was serialized in the March 1981 Whole Earth Catalog. Her book Random Kindness and Senseless Acts of Beauty was published in 2016 by New Village Press.

An article in the December 1991 issue of Glamour about the history of the "random kindness" phrase described Herbert as "tall, blonde, and forty" and as living in Marin County, California.  Between 2005 and 2012, she lived in the Haight-Ashbury in the guise of a street person, while writing and editing.

Anne Herbert died on December 18, 2015, in Alameda, California.

References

External links

 Peace and Love and Noticing the Details – blog maintained by Herbert between 2005 and June, 2015

American women journalists
1952 births
2015 deaths
20th-century American journalists
20th-century American women writers
21st-century American women writers